Days That Shook the World is a British documentary television series that premiered on BBC Two on 17 September 2003 and lasted for three series. Each 60-minute episode explores either one or two significant events from history through a combination of dramatisation, archive footage, and eyewitness accounts.

It was produced by Lion Television and distributed internationally by BBC Worldwide. It has been broadcast on the BBC, ABC, Discovery Channel UK, The History Channel and Viasat History.

The BBC released all three series on DVD and published a book written by Hugo Davenport to accompany the first series.

The series was also released on DVD by the Polish edition of Newsweek in 2007.

Episodes

References

External links 
 

Days That Shook the World at Lion Television

2000s British documentary television series
2003 British television series debuts
2006 British television series endings
BBC television documentaries about history
History (American TV channel) original programming